Grima may refer to:

People with the surname
 Andrew Grima (1921–2007), Anglo-Italian jewellery designer
 Clara Grima (born 1971), Spanish mathematician
 Clifton Grima, Maltese politician
 Hollie Grima (born 1983), Australian basketballer
 Joe Grima New Zealand-British rugby league footballer
 Joey Grima, Australian rugby league coach
 Jacqueline Padovani Grima, Maltese judge

Other
 Grima (Svalbard), a river in Svalbard
 Gríma Wormtongue, a character in J. R. R. Tolkien's The Lord of the Rings
 Grima the Fell Dragon, a character in the video game Fire Emblem Awakening
 Colombian grima, a sport and martial art practiced in Colombia
 Spanish term for emotional disgust from the sound of chalkboard scraping (fingernails on a chalkboard sound)
 Grima (band), a russian metal band

See also 
 Greema, a fictional alien race in the video game Disney's Stitch: Experiment 626
 Grimas, long sticks used in the Afro-Brazilian dance Maculelê
 Grimer, a Pokémon
 Grimma, a town in the Free State of Saxony, Central Germany